Camille Hurel (born February 7, 1998) is a French fashion model.

Career 
She participated in the Elite Model Look contest. She debuted as a Givenchy semi-exclusive F/W 2015. (Though Elite Model Management sponsors the contest, she was scouted by Women Management). She had walked in 52 shows during the S/S 2017 season. She has walked the runway for Dior, Valentino, Fendi, Chanel, Versace, Alberta Ferretti, and Versace. 
Hurel was one of Karl Lagerfeld's bride for Chanel Haute Couture.
Hurel appeared on models.com's "Hot List" in 2018.

References 

French female models
Models from Paris
Living people
1998 births
Women Management models